Bled Jezero railway station is the principal railway station in Bled, Slovenia. The station is located above the west coast of Lake Bled. It is connected to the lake and the settlement Zaka by a footpath. It is located on the Jesenice - Sežana railway and train services from Jesenice to Nova Gorica call here approximately once every two hours in each direction, however the timetable is irregular. Some of the services are extended from/to Ljubljana and Sežana.

References

External links 
Official site of the Slovenian railways

Railway stations in Slovenia